KDLX (94.3 FM) is a Top 40 (CHR) radio station licensed in Makawao, Hawaii, United States. The station is currently owned by Visionary Related Entertainment, Inc.

History
The station went on the air as KVIB on 1980-02-19.  On 1990-08-17, the station changed its call sign to the current KDLX.

References

External links

DLX
Radio stations established in 1980
1980 establishments in Hawaii
Contemporary hit radio stations in the United States